Júlio Cézar Rebollal Rodriguez López (born 6 June 1967 in Rio de Janeiro) is a former international freestyle and medley swimmer from Brazil. He participated for his native South American country at the 1988 Summer Olympics in Seoul, South Korea.

Participated at the 1986 World Aquatics Championships in Madrid, where he finished 23rd in the 400m medley, and 28th in the 200m medley.

He was at the 1987 Pan American Games, in Indianapolis. He won the bronze medal in the 4 × 100 m and in the 4 × 200 m free. He also finished 4th in the 200m free, and 8th in the 200m medley.

At the 1988 Summer Olympics in Seoul, he finished 10th in the 4 × 200 m free, 12th in the 4 × 100 m free, 26th in the 200m medley, and 30th in the 200m free.

Rebollal obtained his best result at the 1991 Pan American Games in Havana, where he won the gold medal in the 4 × 100 m freestyle.

References

External links 
 
 

1967 births
Living people
Swimmers from Rio de Janeiro (city)
Brazilian male freestyle swimmers
Brazilian male medley swimmers
Swimmers at the 1987 Pan American Games
Swimmers at the 1988 Summer Olympics
Swimmers at the 1991 Pan American Games
Olympic swimmers of Brazil
Pan American Games gold medalists for Brazil
Pan American Games bronze medalists for Brazil
Pan American Games medalists in swimming
Medalists at the 1987 Pan American Games
Medalists at the 1991 Pan American Games
21st-century Brazilian people
20th-century Brazilian people